Brazauskas is  a Lithuanian language family name. Female forms are Brazauskienė and Brazauskaitė.

The surname may refer to:

Algirdas Brazauskas, former President of Lithuania
Romualdas Brazauskas, Lithuanian basketball referee
Sandra Brazauskaitė
Ona Brazauskaitė-Mašiotienė

Lithuanian-language surnames